Thomas Fitch IV (c. 1699 – July 18, 1774) was governor of the Connecticut Colony from 1754 to 1766.

Family and early life
Fitch was born at Norwalk, Connecticut, the son of Thomas Fitch III (1675–1731), an investor in the Equivalent Lands and his first wife, Sarah Boardman Fitch. He graduated from Yale in 1721 then went on to obtain a master's degree.  Fitch married Hannah Hall in 1724.  The couple had several children, the first Thomas Fitch, V, was born in 1725.  Thomas Fitch IV served as Norwalk Justice of the Peace, Deputy and Assistant to the Connecticut General Assembly, Deputy Governor, Chief Justice (to the Connecticut Superior Court), and finally Governor of the Colony of Connecticut.

Fitch died July 18, 1774.  He is buried in the East Norwalk Historical Cemetery.

His grave inscription

THE HONORABLE THOMAS FITCH, ESQ.
GOV. OF THE COLONY OF CONNECTICUT,

Eminent and distinguished among mortals.
for great abilities, large acquirements, and a
virtuous character.
a clear, strong, sedate mind,
and an accurate, extensive acquaintance
with law and civil government;
a happy talent of presiding,
close application and strict fidelity,
in the discharge of important trusts,
no less than.
for his employments by the voice of the people
in the chief offices of State,
and at the head of the colony.
Having served his generation by the will of God,
fell asleep July 18 in Domini 1774,
in the 75th year of his age.

Fitch house
The Fitch house was partially burned during the "burning of Norwalk" raid carried out by William Tryon and British troops in July 1779 and only one wing of the house was left standing.  Fitch descendants lived in the rebuilt house until 1945. In 1956 the Fitch house was relocated to make way for the construction of the Connecticut Turnpike.  It stands today as part of the Mill Hill Historic Park in Norwalk next to the Green.

Legacy 
Fitch Street in East Norwalk is named in honor of the Fitch family including: Thomas Fitch I (1612–1704), a town founder; Thomas IV, the governor; and Thomas Fitch V, soldier and patriot.

His son, Colonel Thomas Fitch, V (1725–1795), served with British colonial troops in the French and Indian Wars; primarily in upstate New York, near Fort Crailo.  After that conflict Thomas, V returned to Norwalk and was a prominent resident during and after the American Revolution.  He served as a town councilman and helped with the reconstruction efforts after the burning of Norwalk in 1779.

The former Thomas Fitch school along Strawberry Hill Avenue in Norwalk was named in his honor, as well as to honor the other Thomas Fitches who contributed to the town.

The unincorporated settlement of Fitchville, located in the Firelands area of the historic Connecticut Western Reserve in the State of Ohio, is named for the governor and his family.

References

External links 
Connecticut State Library Bio

Further reading 
 Donald Lines Jacobus, " The Mother of Governor Thomas Fitch " The American Genealogist, Vol. 17, No. 2 (October 1940) [at 17:113-14].
 Martin C. Babicz, For Empire, Colony and Self-Interest: Thomas Fitch and Connecticut Colonial Politics, University of Colorado at Boulder, ProQuest Dissertations Publishing, 2009.

1699 births
1774 deaths
Burials in East Norwalk Historical Cemetery
Colonial governors of Connecticut
History of Norwalk, Connecticut
American justices of the peace
Members of the Connecticut General Assembly Council of Assistants (1662–1818)
Members of the Connecticut House of Representatives
Politicians from Norwalk, Connecticut
Yale College alumni
Burials in Connecticut